Poesia is a word in Italian, Catalan, Occitan and Portuguese meaning "poetry". Its Spanish and Galician equivalent is spelled poesía.

It can also refer to:
 Poesia (magazine), an Italian-language poetry magazine

 Poesia (album)
 946 Poësia, a Themistian asteroid
 MSC Poesia, a cruise ship owned and operated by MSC Cruises
 POESIA, a programming language for Siemens 2002 computers
 Letras & Poesía, a Spanish-language literary website